Bianca Florentina Ghelber (née Perie; born 1 June 1990) is a hammer thrower from Romania. Her personal best throw is 74.18 metres, achieved in August at Tokyo Olympics 2020.

Career
Perie was born in Roman. As a junior, she was dominant in her field. She won gold medals at the 2005 World Youth Championships, the 2006 World Junior Championships, the 2007 World Youth Championships, the 2007 European Junior Championships and the 2008 World Junior Championships. She also competed at the 2007 World Championships and the 2008 and 2012 Olympic Games without reaching the final.

Achievements

References

External links
 

1990 births
Living people
Romanian female hammer throwers
Athletes (track and field) at the 2008 Summer Olympics
Athletes (track and field) at the 2012 Summer Olympics
Olympic athletes of Romania
Universiade medalists in athletics (track and field)
Universiade bronze medalists for Romania
People from Roman, Romania
Medalists at the 2011 Summer Universiade
Athletes (track and field) at the 2020 Summer Olympics
20th-century Romanian women
21st-century Romanian women
European Athletics Championships winners